The Edge of the World: A Cultural History of the North Sea and the Transformation of Europe is a history narrative written for the general public. It was published in 2014 by Pegasus Books and written by Michael Pye. The book tells a history based on neglected archival sources and fresh interpretations of other sources. It covers the period from the fall of the Roman empire to just before Europe's emergence from the medieval era. The story focuses on the impact of the medieval North Sea cultures.

Pye, the author,  "...[brings] back to life a mostly forgotten cast of medieval shippers, marauders, thinkers and tinkerers, [and] he challenges us to consider how we got to be where — and who — we are."

References

External links
 
 

American non-fiction books
History books about Europe
Books about Europe
2014 non-fiction books
North Sea